Isabelle Pieman (born 28 September 1983) is a Belgian former competitive figure skater. She won five senior international medals and three Belgian national titles (2007, 2009, 2012). At the 2009 Nebelhorn Trophy, Pieman qualified a spot for Belgium in the ladies' singles event at the 2010 Winter Olympics in Vancouver, where she placed 25th. She qualified to the free skate at the 2012 European Championships in Sheffield.

Programs

Results

References

External links

 

Belgian female single skaters
1983 births
Living people
Sportspeople from Brussels
Figure skaters at the 2010 Winter Olympics
Olympic figure skaters of Belgium
21st-century Belgian women